Bullenbung is a rural locality in the central east part of the Riverina.  It is situated by road, about 19 kilometres north east of Lockhart and 21 kilometres south east of Collingullie.

Bullenbung Post Office, shown in Post Office history as Bullenbong, opened on 1 November 1888 and closed in 1903.

Notes and references

Towns in the Riverina
Towns in New South Wales